

Men's tournament
The 2008 Men's Basketball Cup was contested by eight teams and won by Primeiro de Agosto. The final was played on April 23 and 26, 2008.

Women's tournament
The 2008 Women's Basketball Cup was also won by Primeiro de Agosto.

See also
 2008 Angola Basketball Super Cup
 2008 BAI Basket

References

Angola Basketball Cup seasons
Cup